Prem N. Reddy (born 1948 in India) is a cardiologist and an owner of Prime Healthcare Services, Inc., which owns 45 hospitals.

Life and career 
Reddy was born in a rural village called Niduguntapalem, Nellore district in southern India.  He graduated from Sri Venkateswara University Medical College in 1973. In 1976 Reddy and his wife immigrated to the United States.

Reddy, who holds an MD, FACC, and FCCP, is a board-certified physician in internal medicine and cardiology. He is a Fellow of the American College of Cardiology and the American College of Chest Physicians. During two decades of practice, Reddy performed more than 5,000 cardiac procedures (such as coronary angiography and angioplasty, and permanent pacemaker implantations). Reddy is no longer licensed to practice medicine in California.

Healthcare management and entrepreneurship 
In the early 1980s, Reddy founded Desert Valley Medical Group in Victorville, CA and established Primecare Medical Group in 1992. He also founded PrimeRx, with 250,000 managed care patients, generating over $500 million in revenues a headquartered in Las Vegas, Nevada. He established Desert Valley Hospital in 1994 which today stands as the flagship hospital in the California healthcare system known as Prime Healthcare Services. Desert Valley Hospital has been recognized as a Top 100 Hospital in the Nation on numerous occasions.

In 2013 eight Prime Healthcare Hospitals were named in the "Top 100 Hospitals in the Nation" by Truven, formerly Thomson Reuters. In 2021, several hospitals were named in the "Top 100 Hospitals in the Nation."  Hospitals that receive these awards are noted for their high clinical standards, "that achieve the highest national scores based on 14 separate measures of hospital performance - operational, clinical and financial - that affect patients as well as the quality of care in the community." Prime Healthcare Services was recognized as a "Top 15 Health System" in 2013, the third time they have been on the list in five years.

Charity 
Reddy and his family have established the Prem Reddy Family Foundation, which has supported a number of efforts, including the California University of Science and Medicine, the Dr. Prem Reddy Nursing Laboratory at CSUSB, and the Dr. Prem Reddy Lecture Hall at Western University of Health Sciences.

Controversy
On 8 July 2007, the Los Angeles Times ran a news story that alleged that the policies of Prime HealthCare Services, Inc. resulted in higher than average profits at the possible cost of patient care. According to the Times story, "When Reddy's company, Prime Healthcare Services Inc., takes over a hospital, it typically cancels insurance contracts, allowing the hospital to collect steeply higher reimbursements. It has suspended services — such as chemotherapy treatments, mental health care and birthing centers — that patients need but aren't lucrative.... On four occasions since 2002, inspectors have found that Prime Healthcare facilities failed to meet minimum federal safety standards, placing their Medicare funding at risk."

In 2005, two former nurses at Desert Valley Hospital won a lawsuit in which they claimed they were improperly fired after they accused hospital management of providing inadequate care to save money and Reddy of repeatedly reporting to work while under the influence of alcohol.  In February 1999, Reddy was arrested for allegedly attacking Harry Lifschutz at Desert Valley Medical Group. Reddy jumped over a desk in the doctor's waiting room and allegedly attempted to choke him and take a laptop from Lifschutz's office.

Prime Healthcare Services is understood by the United States Department of Health and Human Services and the California Department of Justice about concerns over a reported spike in sepsis. The investigation centers around whether the spike in sepsis represents a large public health issue or potential Medicare fraud. Six Prime hospitals ranked in the 99th percentile of U.S. hospitals for sepsis and five were in the 95th percentile.

Prem Reddy was personally liable in a negotiated settlement regarding False Claims at 14 Prime Hospitals. Out of the $65 million settlement, he had to pay $3.25 million.

In July 2021 US Department of Justice announce another settlement with Prime Health Care and Prem Reddy concerning kickbacks, overcharging for medical implants, and billing for a non-eligible provider by using another provider's billing identity. The violations directly implicated Dr. Reddy in the kickbacks. Dr. Reddy paid $1,775,000; and Prime paid $33,725,000.

References

External links
Personal website
Prime Healthcare

1948 births
Living people
American health care businesspeople
Prime Healthcare Services
Health fraud
Fraud in the United States
Medical controversies in the United States
Sri Venkateswara University alumni
Fellows of the American College of Cardiology